Julian Lewis Jones (born 21 August 1968) is a Welsh actor. He is best known for his work in Invictus and the Justice League.

Career
Originally from Anglesey, Jones lives in Nantgaredig. A fluent Welsh speaker, he has appeared on various productions on the Welsh-language channel S4C, including as a presenter of a popular fishing programme Sgota.

In 2010, he appeared in the TV series The Tudors as Mr. Roper (the park keeper) in Season 4, Episode 1. Also in 2010 he appeared on British TV series Spooks (US title MI-5) as Russian spy Viktor Barenshik in Season 9, Episode 3. From 2012 onwards he appeared in the Sky One drama-comedy series Stella as Karl Morris, and in 2012 in an episode of the BBC Two drama-comedy series Ambassadors.

Jones portrayed Atlan, King of Atlantis, in the superhero film Justice League (2017)<ref>{{cite web|last=McNary|first=Dave|url=https://variety.com/2016/film/news/justice-league-cast-julian-lewis-jones-1201808847/amp/|title=Justice League Casts Invictus actor Julian Lewis Jones|date=5 July 2016|work=Variety|access-date=14 October 2017}}</ref> and the director's cut Zack Snyder's Justice League'' (2021).

Political views

Jones is a supporter of Welsh independence, joining YesCymru in June 2020.

Filmography

Film

TV

References

External links

1968 births
Living people
Actors from Anglesey
Welsh-speaking actors
Welsh male television actors
20th-century Welsh male actors
21st-century Welsh male actors
Alumni of the Royal Welsh College of Music & Drama
Welsh male film actors